"" is the tenth Japanese single release from Hitomi Yaida. It is also the second single taken from the album Air/Cook/Sky.
Also released as a limited edition with CD-Extra options to access a special website.

Bell, Book and Candle is a cover version of the track by Mark Hewerdine that was released on his album Thanksgiving, with Yaida's Japanese lyrics.

It reached number two in the charts on September 27, 2003.

Track listing

Notes

External links
 Hitori Jenga PV

2003 singles
Hitomi Yaida songs
Songs written by Hitomi Yaida
2003 songs
Songs written by Boo Hewerdine